Round Valley is a former settlement in Plumas County, California, at an elevation of 4521 feet (1378 m).

The Round Valley post office opened in 1863, closed for a time in 1870, and closed finally in 1873.

References

Former populated places in California
Former settlements in Plumas County, California